Nemotelus is a subgenus of flies in the family Stratiomyidae.

Species
N. albitarsis Lindner, 1965
N. annulipes Lindner, 1965
N. assimilis Lindner, 1965
N. barracloughi (Mason, 1997)
N. basilaris (Woodley, 2001)
N. mongolia (Woodley, 2001)
N. natalensis Lindner, 1965
N. nigribasis Lindner, 1965
N. notatus Zetterstedt, 1842
N. pantherinus (Linnaeus, 1758)
N. stuckenbergi Lindner, 1965
N. tricolor Lindner, 1965
N. tschorsnigi (Mason, 1997)
N. uliginosus (Linnaeus, 1767)

References

Stratiomyidae
Diptera of Europe
Insect subgenera
Taxa named by Étienne Louis Geoffroy